John 20:14 is the fourteenth verse of the twentieth chapter of the Gospel of John in the New Testament of the Christian Bible.  In this verse, Mary Magdalene has just finished speaking to the angels she found in Jesus's empty tomb.  She then turns and sees the resurrected Jesus, but fails to recognize him.  In the Gospel of John, this is the first moment anyone sees Jesus after his resurrection.

Content
The King James Version translates the passage as:
And when she had thus said, she turned herself back, and saw Jesus standing, and knew not that it was Jesus.

For a collection of other versions see BibleHub John 20:14

Analysis
It is significant that it is Mary Magdalene who is the first to see the risen Jesus, but it raises the question of why she does not recognise him; in the next verse she mistakes him for the gardener.  One interpretation is that the resurrected Jesus did not have the same physical form as before, but rather a wholly new appearance.  John Calvin argued that the fault is with Mary, seeing her blindness in the face of Jesus as a metaphor for those who fail to see Jesus despite his divine nature.  This episode does not appear in the other Gospels.

That the angels of the previous two verses are from this point wholly forgotten is to Schnackenberg evidence that the angels were a later addition to the text and that the original narrative did not include them.

References

Further reading
Jesus Appears to His Disciples

20:14
John 20:14